Haitian Chileans,  are Chilean citizens of full or partial Haitian ancestry.

Demographics
It's one of the migrations that have grown the most in Chile in recent years, with 731% between 2013 and 2016, a period in which the arrival of 41,000 people is estimated. Prior to 2013, some 4,000 Haitian immigrants were estimated to be living in Chile. In the 2002 census, the Haitian population living in Chile was only 50 people.

The vast majority of Haitians in Chile arrived as tourists since they did not need to apply for a visa beforehand, and then overstayed without returning to Haiti. Following the election of Sebastian Piñera who ran on a platform of stemming this illegal immigration, the visa-free entry for Haitians was cancelled.

In 2017 there were 105,000 Haitians in Chile. By the end of 2019 this number had grown considerably to 185,865 according to the National Statistics Institute.

Notable people
Jean Beausejour, footballer

See also
Chile–Haiti relations
Afro-Chileans

References

 
Chile